This is a list of public art on the Victoria Embankment in London.

The embankment is a road and river-walk on the north bank of the River Thames, formed from land reclaimed during the construction of Joseph Bazalgette's sewerage system in the late 19th century. From 1864 a sequence of public gardens called the Victoria Embankment Gardens was created from this land. Running from north-east to south-west, these are called Temple Gardens, the Main Garden, the Whitehall Garden and finally the Ministry of Defence section; the last of these was laid out in 1939–1959. All four gardens contain works of commemorative sculpture and further memorials are located on the river-walk or road itself, making the Embankment one of the main sites for commemoration in London.

City of London

City of Westminster

References

Bibliography

 

 

 

 

Victoria Embankment
Victoria Embankment